Henk Faanhof (29 August 1922 – 27 January 2015) was a Dutch professional road bicycle racer from Amsterdam. Faanhof won one stage in the 1954 Tour de France. In 1947 Faanhof was disqualified in the Dutch National Road Race Championship after changing bicycles with a teammate. The rule that bicycle changes were not allowed was new and Faanhof did not know about it. He also competed in three events at the 1948 Summer Olympics. Faanhof died in Amsterdam on 27 January 2015, aged 92, less than a week before two other members of the Dutch men's team pursuit squad, Gerrit Voorting and Joop Harmans.

Major results

1949
 World Amateur champion road race
1950
Sas van Gent
1951
GP de Marmignolles
1952
Hoensbroek
Alphen aan de Rijn
1954
Tour de France:
Winner stage 9

See also
 List of Dutch Olympic cyclists

References

External links

Official Tour de France results for Henk Faanhof
Oudste Nederlandse Tourrenner Faanhof (92) overladen

1922 births
2015 deaths
Dutch male cyclists
Dutch Tour de France stage winners
Cyclists at the 1948 Summer Olympics
Olympic cyclists of the Netherlands
Cyclists from Amsterdam
UCI Road World Championships cyclists for the Netherlands
20th-century Dutch people